Kolukhi may refer to:
 Kolukhi, Mashhad, Razavi Khorasan Province
 Kolukhi, Quchan, Razavi Khorasan Province
 Kolukhi, Sistan and Baluchestan